Susan Maria Sica (born 22 January 1998) is an Italian épée fencer, competing for Great Britain and the current national champion. Her club is S.S. Lazio Scherma Ariccia.

In her first season competing for Great Britain, Sica finished 24th in the World Championships in Budapest, Hungary, losing to Violetta Kolobova. In addition, Sica has competed for Great Britain at numerous World Cups, Satellites and European Circuit events.

References

External links

1998 births
Living people
Italian expatriates in the United Kingdom
Italian female épée fencers
20th-century Italian women
21st-century Italian women